Soviet occupation of Poland may refer to:

 Occupation of Poland (1939–45), by Nazi Germany and the Soviet Union
 People's Republic of Poland, heavily dominated by Soviet influence
 History of Poland (1945–89)